Windsong is an album by John Denver, and its title song.

Windsong or Wind Song may also refer to

Music
Windsong (band), 1970s London-based
Windsong International, a record label
Windstar Records, formerly known as Windsong
"Wind Song" (Ruslana song), a song by Ruslana
Wind Songs, a 1996 album by Michael Hoppé and Tim Wheater 
Windsong, a 1971 cello concerto by Paul Chihara

Other
Wind Song (ship), a yacht owned by Windstar Cruises
Wind song, a Prince Matchabelli perfume; see Georges V. Matchabelli